In the courts of England and Wales, a 'leapfrog' appeal is a special and relatively rare form of appeal in which a case which was heard by the High Court in its capacity as a trial court, an appellate court or as a source of judicial review is appealed directly to the Supreme Court, or previously the House of Lords (skipping the Court of Appeal). 

Typically leapfrog appeals are permitted only when the High Court was bound by a previous decision of the Supreme Court or House of Lords and therefore the party appealing the decision could not succeed in the Court of Appeal (because lower courts cannot overturn the decisions of higher courts). The case must also be seen as a "point of law of general public importance" and both parties must agree to the 'leapfrogging'.

The purpose of a 'leapfrog' appeal is to avoid the excess time and resources used in litigating an appeal in a court in which it could not succeed as a 'stepping stone' to a court where it could.

Key contemporary examples include the leapfrog appeals in the Miller case, and the Cherry and Miller joint cases, both major judicial review appeals heard en banc.

Exchequer Chamber

A similar condition existed with the erection of the Court of Exchequer Chamber, a court of error, in 1585.  This court consisted of the justices of the Common Pleas, as well as those barons of the Exchequer of Pleas that were of the Order of the Coif, and had full power to review decisions made by the Queen's Bench and correct errors manifest. However, under certain conditions, writs of error could still lie from Parliament to Queen's Bench, skipping the Exchequer Chamber.

References

English law